Fragaria chiloensis, the beach strawberry, Chilean strawberry, or coastal strawberry, is one of two species of wild strawberry that were hybridized to create the modern garden strawberry (F. × ananassa). It is native to the Pacific Ocean coasts of North and South America.

Description
It is an evergreen plant growing to 15–30 centimetres (6–12 inches) tall. The relatively thick leaves are glossy green and trifoliate, each leaflet around 5 cm (2 in) long. The stems are covered with long hairs and the leaves sometimes have a dense fringe of hairs. The flowers are white, produced in spring and early summer. The fruit, a strawberry, is edible, red on the surface and white inside.

Genetics 
All strawberries have a base haploid count of 7 chromosomes. F. chiloensis is octoploid, having eight sets of these chromosomes for a total of 56. These eight genomes pair as four distinct sets, of two different types, with little or no pairing between sets. The genome composition of the octoploid strawberry species has generally been indicated as AAA'A'BBB'B'. The  genomes were likely contributed by diploid ancestors related to F. vesca or similar species, while the  genomes seem to descend from a close relative of F. iinumae. The exact process of hybridization and speciation which resulted in the octoploid species is still unknown, but it appears that the genome compositions of both F. chiloensis and F. virginiana (and by extension the cultivated octoploid strawberry as well) are identical.

Subspecies 

There are a number of subspecies and forms:
 Fragaria chiloensis subsp. chiloensis forma chiloensis
 Fragaria chiloensis subsp. chiloensis forma patagonica (Argentina, Chile)
 Fragaria chiloensis subsp. lucida (E. Vilm. ex Gay) Staudt (coast of British Columbia, Washington, Oregon, California)
 Fragaria chiloensis subsp. pacifica Staudt (coast of Alaska, British Columbia, Washington, Oregon, California)
 Fragaria chiloensis subsp. sandwicensis (Decne.) Staudt – ʻŌhelo papa (Hawaii)

Distribution and habitat 

The plant's natural range is the Pacific Ocean coasts of North and South America, and also Hawaii, where it grows mostly on sand beaches above the tidal zone in temperate to warm-temperate regions. Migratory birds are thought to have dispersed F. chiloensis from the Pacific coast of North America to the mountains of Hawaii, Chile, and Argentina.

Amédée-François Frézier (1682–1773) was the first to bring back specimens of the species to the Old World.

Ecology 
Chaetosiphon fragaefolii, the strawberry aphid, is a bug species found feed on F. chiloensis in Chile. It is a vector of the strawberry mild yellow-edge virus.

Uses 
Its fruit is sold as a local delicacy in some South American produce markets.

References

External links 

 
 
 
 Jepson Manual Treatment – Fragaria chiloensis
 

chiloensis
Berries
Flora of the West Coast of the United States
Flora of Alaska
Flora of Argentina
Flora of British Columbia
Flora of southern Chile
Flora of Hawaii
Garden plants of North America
Garden plants of South America
Groundcovers
Taxa named by Philip Miller
Flora without expected TNC conservation status